Bae Hae-sun (born May 8, 1974) is a South Korean film, television, musical and stage actress. Bae debut in 1995 as understudy in play Gone with the Wind. Bae built her acting career step by step, going back and forth between small and large theaters, musicals and plays.

She debuted in television in 2015 with supporting role Nurse Hwang in SBS drama Yong-pal. Bae then is known for her supporting roles in television dramas such as, Don't Dare to Dream, Judge vs. Judge, A Pledge to God, Hi Bye, Mama!, Hotel del Luna, Happiness, All of Us Are Dead, and her lead role in Political Fever.

Early years
Bae Hae-sun was born on May 8, 1974 in Seoul. Since she was a child, her singing talent has been extraordinary. Bae made the women in the neighborhood who farm cabbages into the audience and sang in front of them and received performance fees. The coin pocket hung around the neck of the young Bae who returned home in the evening after playing outside all day, was always heavy. "Once I sang, I went up to a high place like a wall and image it as a stage," she added.

Bae can’t properly expressed her overflowing talent in the harsh family atmosphere. After finishing high school, Bae applied to Department of Theater of Seoul Institute of the Arts following her friend recommendation. A professor who noticed Bae Hae-sun singing during the entrance examination said, "You should do this kind of work," and the number "Miss Saigon" in the car one day led her to the path of a musical. Bae Hae-sun said, "I've never seen a musical performance before," and recalled, "But the moment I heard the song, I could feel my blood boiling hot and I was so happy that there was a genre where I could share music and acting."

Career

Debut (1995 to 2000) 
Bae debuted on the professional stage in 1995, when she was in her second year of college. She took on an understudy  for the role of Scarlett O'Hara in the play Gone with the Wind directed by her teacher, Professor Kim Hyo-kyung (died in 2015). Park Sang-ah played the role of Scarlett O'Hara, Lee Deok-hwa played the role of Rhett Butler and Kim Kap-soo played the role of Ashley, and they performed at the Grand Theater of the Sejong Center for the Performing Arts, from July 29 to August 2, 1995. However, Bae was unable to stand on the actual performance stage. There has never been a case where actress Park Sang-ah, was inevitably absent.

After that, Bae entered the theater troupe You Theater (극단 "유 you") and began acting training in earnest. Her first work on the actual professional stage, was in play Taxi Driver, written and directed by director Jang Jin, in February 1997. She played the role of Hwa-yi, one of taxi passenger who also the ex-lover of Deok-bae (Choi Min-sik). It was followed by role as chorus in Leo Tolstoy play Holstomer - The story of a horse, performed at Hoam Art Hall from May 10 to June 1, 1997. In October of the same year, Bae reprised role Hwa-yi in (21st) Seoul Theater Festival: Taxi Driver - Where are you going? In 1998 She acted as Marianne A in Molière play L'Avare at Culture and Art Hall Small Theater from February 21 to March 13, 1998.

Turning point for Bae was the musical Sworn Brother, directed by Kim Min-ki (1998). At the time, at the age of 25, she was cast as Gannan, who works as a housemaid for a rich regimental commander, who found out that she is pregnant with twins and struggles with raising multiple children.

Career as Musical and Stage Actress (2000 to 2014) 
In 2000, Bae was member of the theater company Hakjeon (CEO Kim Min-ki). She started her career as musical actress in earnest as ensemble casts in musical "Subway Line 1". It earned her nomination as best rookie award in 2001 Korean Musical Award. In the same year, Bae acted as Serena in musical Fame at LG Art Center, September 29 to October 15, 2000. In 2001, Bae played as Bae Jang-hwa in play Bae Jang-hwa Bae Hong-ryeon (played by Jeongbok-geun, directed by Han Tae-sook) of the troupe, which were performed at the small theater of the Dongsung-dong Literature Center in Seoul. Bae worked again with You Troupe in play A Midsummer Night's Dream as Puck.

In 2002, Musical The Rehearsal. The Rehearsal, was held at Mesa Popcorn Hall in Namdaemun from the 26th to February 17. Bae won the rookie actress award at the 8th Korean Musical Awards for 'The Rehearsal' in 2002. Followed by role in the musical Cheoyoung. 

In the middle of 2002 Bae was selected as Annette in musical Saturday Night Fever. She suffered an injury that stretched the ligaments in her right ankle. It turned 180 degrees while practicing. She was in a situation where She might have to give up her life as an actress. Bae participated in the practice with a cast on her legs for more than two months, and the whole practice! immersed in singing and acting practice alone. Bae said, “Six months ago, it was hell. I like to dance in this work, but I might never be able to dance again. I was so painful because of anxiety. But the role of Annette is better than dancing. Yoon Seok-hwa's encouragement and rebuke that singing and acting are more important. I put it out.” She quickly overcame her injury with determination" and soon after, she rose to the lead role on a wider stage.

The 20th anniversary of rock musical "Subway Line 1" of the theatre company Hakjeon. Subway Line 1 also has a high reputation as an 'Actor's Academy'. Seol Kyung-gu, Bang Eun-jin, Jo Seung-woo, Jang Hyun-sung, Hwang Jeong-min. It was held on November 5 to 8, 2003, at the Grand Theater of the Seoul Daehak-ro Literature Promotion Agency.

In 2003 she was selected as Sophie in Mamma Mia! She initially auditioned for the role of Sophie's friend. However, the directors were impressed with her acting and gave her the title role. This role laid the groundwork for her career as a lead role in a large musical. Korean premiere was premiered at the Seoul Arts Center Opera Theater from January to April, 2003, mobilizing a total of 200,000 audiences, earning 14 billion won.

In 2004, Bae starred in the encore performance of Saturday Night Fever. In autumn 2004, Bae appeared as the main character in musical Crazy for You, a Broadway musical, a masterpiece of choreographer Susan Stroman. The performances were held until October 3, 2004 at the Sejong Performing Arts Center. In December 2004, Bae reprised her role as Sophie in Mamma Mia! The musical was opened at the Daegu Opera House on January 15, 2005. It was performed about 50 times for about 6 weeks.

Double cast with Moon Hye-young, Bae acted as Susan in Korean production of musical Tick, Tick... Boom! Directed by Shim Jae-chan, it was staged from May 23 to 29, 2005. The performance was The first work of 'Musical Favorites' prepared by Shinshi Musical Company (CEO Park Myung-sung) to commemorate the opening of the New City Musical Theater (formerly Polymedia Theater) in Daehak-ro. Bae was praised for her cute acting.

In 2005, Bae was initially auditioned for role Aida, however she landed Amneris role in the first Korean premiere of musical Aida. Through this work, in 2005, Bae won Best Actress Award at the 11th Korean Musical Awards.

In 2006, Bae acted as Camille Claudel in musical Camille Claudel. Camille Claudel (1864-1943), a 19th-century French sculptor and lover of Rodin, is a tragic figure who has been suffering between her art world and love and has been in a psychiatric hospital for 30 years. Korean first premiere was the fifth works of Sinsie's Musical Favorites, opened from July 7, 2006 as open run at the Daehakuro Shinshi Musical Theater. 

In late 2006, Bae and Kim Seon-yeong, were double-cast the main characters in the musical Evita, which opened in November. Bae Hae-sun as Eva Peron was showing off a gorgeous dress at the press rehearsal at the LG Art Center in Yeoksam-dong on the afternoon of the 16th.

In 2007, Bae was appointed as ambassador for The Musical Awards with actor Oh Man-seok. 

In 2007, Bae was triple-cast as lead role in the musical Dancing Shadow with Kim Bo-kyung and Kim Sung-jo as title role Shinda. The male protagonist Solomon was played by Shin Sung-rok. Produced by Shinshi Musical Company, the musical Dancing Shadow based on the play written by playwright Cha Beom-seok was first planned in 1999. The musical script was written by Ariel Dorfman. The composition was commissioned by Eric Woolfson, and directed by Paul Gerington. The work held a workshop in England on September, 2006.

In 2007, Bae and Ock Joo-hyun played the part of murderess Roxie Hart in the first South-Korean production of the Broadway musical Chicago. Shinshi Musical Company held the popular musical at the Sejong Center for two weeks from September 18 to September 30, 2007.

In 2008 Bae reprised Roxy Hart in the encore performance of South-Korean production of the Broadway musical Chicago. Followed by role as Casino showgirl in Eric Woolfson musical Gambler. In winter 2008, Bae, acted in role Catholic actress Catherine in the musical The Last 5 Years. The play opened on November 28, 2008 at Chungmu Art Hall in Sindang-dong, Seoul and ran to February 22, 2009.

Bae returned to the play stage for the first time in 8 years and challenges a play. In the opening work of the Seoul Theater Festival 'Women of Picasso', which weaves the monologue of four women who loved Picasso in an omnibus way, she played the role of Francois, a painter who loves Pablo Picasso (1881-1973), who is 40 years older. Unlike other women who have not been able to escape the shade of Picasso, Francois is an independent woman who leaves the house with her children when Picasso cheats. It was performed at the Towol Theater of the Seoul Arts Center on April 16th and 26th, 2009.

In 2009, Bae and Baek Min-jung appeared in the role of Milady in musical The Three Musketeers. The musical emerged as the most anticipated work of 2009, and was performed from May 12th to June 21st at the Grand Theater of Chungmu Art Hall.

Austrian musical Mozart, performed on the stage of the Sejong Center for the Performing Arts in Seoul from February 19 to 21, 2010 was the first Austrian musical to be introduced in Korea. It depicts Mozart's musical journey through love-deed relationships with people around him, including Mozart's father, Leopold, Mozart's guardian, Archbishop, and his lover, Constance. Bae acted as Mozart’s older sister, Nannell Mozart.

In 2011, Bae acted the role of Jang Mi-joo in the play Chrysanthemum Fragrance.

In 2012, Bae starred in Korean production of Bob Goepfert’s musical The Memory Show as daughter in law. The musical 'Mom, The Memory Show', which depicts happiness through the recovery of the family, especially the relationship between mother and daughter, was on the stage at Elim Hall in Daehangno, Seoul on August 28 and  continued until November 25, 2012.

Bae then acted opposite Park Ho-san in Kim Min-jung musical Eric Satie. Park Ho-san in the role of Eric Satie and Bae Hae-sun in the role of Susan, the woman Satie loved. Directed by Park Hye-sun, it was held from November 22 to December 1, 2013 at the Grand Theater of Daehak-ro Arts Theater in Dongsung-dong, Seoul. In her final project in 2013, Bae acted as Agatha Christie (1890-1976), who is called the queen of British mystery novels, in Kim Soo-ro's musical Agatha. Kim Soo-ro, joined hands with Kim Tae-hyung, the star director of Daehak-ro, and presented it as 'Kim Soo-ro Project 8th'. The performance production company Asia Bridge Contents Co., Ltd. announced on November 26, that it will perform the musical Agatha at Dongguk University's Lee Hae-rang Arts Theater on the December 31, 2013.  The performance continued until March 2, 2014.

Debut in television (2015 to present) 
After around two decades as a stage actress, in 2015, Bae debuted in television. Bae was offered many roles in television since her early 30s, but she had to turn down offers repeatedly because her performance schedule had always been tight. In the aftermath of the MERS, one of her performance was postponed, leaving a gap in her schedule. Written by Jang Hyuk-rin and directed by Oh Jin-seok, SBS drama series Yongpal were looking for an actress not well-known but with good acting skill. They offered Bae the role with the recommendation of their crew. One of the production crew had seen her acting in the play Scorched Love and had the mindset of wanting to propose a role that requires acting skills to her later. Bae first screen role was nurse Hwang. She was nurse in-charge of 12th floor VVIP ward, where Han Yeo-jin (Kim Tae-hee), an heiress of Hanshin Group, was treated. Nurse Hwang left a strong impression on the viewers by her strange behaviour, treating comatose Han Yeo-jin as her exclusive property. 

After her successful television debut Bae went back to the stage with the role of Liz on the play Tabasco. It was a reunion project with director Park Hye-sun, who worked with Bae on musical Eric Satie. In this work, a middle-aged couple in their 40s who have lived without any change for over 20 years, an actress obsessed with past glory, and an overseas migrant worker who are afraid of being deported look back on their lives through the disappearance of their winning dog, Tabasco, at a dog show. Theatrical company Sagae Tampa announced on August 14, 2015 that the play will perform at Daehangno Arts Theater in Seoul from the November 10 to 26, 2015.

In 2016, Bae and Seo Yi-sook shared the role of Juliet's nanny, in the play Romeo and Juliet. In the same year Bae acted as Sophie in American playwright Terrence McNally play Master Class, based on the true story of the legendary opera singer Maria Callas (1923-1977). She acted opposite veteran actress Yoon Seok-hwa. In autumn 2016, Bae played the role of doctor Geum Seok-ho in Jealousy Incarnate.

In 2017, to commemorate the 20th anniversary of her debut, Bae and two actors decided to do musical project Tick, Tick... Boom! The 2017 Korean production opened at Daehak-ro TOM on August 29. It was running until October 15, 2017. 

Bae was selected to play the role of Dorothy Brock in the 2017 season of musical 42nd Street. The production presentation of the musical 42nd Street was held at the Millennium Seoul Hilton Grand Ballroom in Jung-gu, Seoul on the afternoon of July 17, 2017.

In 2018, she appeared in two feature films, On Your Wedding Day and Dark Figure of Crime. Then, Bae reprised her role as Dorothy Brock in 2018 season performance of Broadway musical 42nd Street. This season was the 22nd anniversary of the Korean license adaptation. It was ended on August 19, recorded an average seat occupancy rate of 95% and a total of 38 sold-out seats, renewing the record for the highest number of sold-outs. It also performed at the Daejeon Arts Center on August 25, followed by performances at Sohyang Art Center in Busan, Gumi Culture and Arts Center, and Ulsan Hyundai Arts Center.

In 2019, Bae reunited with Hwang Jung-min after 20 years, Bae starred as Jocasta in play Oedipus. The two characters she played on the small screen in 2019 confirmed her acting range to the public. Choi Seo-hee, the room service manager of the drama Hotel del Luna was a person who has a warm relationship with the main casts as well as having her own narrative. Her potrayal made viewers cry and laugh. However Lee Gil-ja of the drama VIP was a rich customer and played a significant role in portraying the department store ecosystem in the drama.

In the end of 2019, Bae went back to theater and challenged herself with role Alan in play The 100 Year-Old Man Who Climbed Out of the Window and Disappeared. In addition to the 100-year-old Alan, Bae also appears as various characters such as Franco, Stalin, Song Mei-rin (wife of Taiwan's first president, Chiang Kai-shek), Dr. Eklund (Swedish Institute of Nuclear Physics), and Kim Jong-il.

In 2020, Bae was double-cast with Jung Jae-eun in role wife in 1980 West End and Broadway play by Ronald Harwood, The Dresser.

Bae appeared in two dramas in a row, KBS's drama Into The Ring and tvN's drama It's Okay to Not Be Okay. Bae played the role of Won Won-jeong, an elite politician who has served as a spokesperson for the Seoul Metropolitan Government, the head of the administrative bureau, the head of the Planning and Coordination Office, and the deputy mayor. Her delicate acting as Kang Eun-ja, a patient suffering from psychotic depression. In May 2020, it was announced that Bae will reprise her role as Dorothy Brock in Broadway musical 42nd Street in June 20 to August 23, 2020. 2020 season performance attracted more attention as it entered the Charlotte Theater after 10 years. In SBS drama Alice, Bae played Kim In-sook, who is traumatized by the loss of her son, who has had a heart defect since birth, but raises Jin-gyeom (played by Joo Won), whom her husband brings to her, as if she were her own son.

In 2021, Bae played a villain role in TVING Original Series Happiness. Her role was Oh Yeon-ok, representative of Building 101 who lived in unit 1202.

In 2021, Bae starred as title role Cha Jeong-won, a former prosecutor and conservative opposition lawmaker, in black comedy drama Political Fever.

In 2022 Bae was cast in Netflix Original Series All of Us Are Dead as Park Eun-hee, a member of the National Assembly representing Hyosan. In September 2022, Bae signed an exclusive contract with management agency Lead Entertainment. In late 2022, Bae reprised her role as Dorothy Brock in the 26th anniversary of the musical 42nd Street. It was opened at the CJ Towol Theater in the Seoul Arts Center on November 5, 2022. It was running until January 15, 2023 and ended its performance in Seoul with the highest ever record: an unprecedented sold-out. Bae also joined 2022 regional tour. Starting with performances in Busan (February 3–5), then followed by Goyang (February 10–12), Changwon (February 17–19), Daegu (February 24–26), Cheonan (March 3–5), Jinju (March 10–12), Suwon (March 17–19), Jeonju (March 24–26), Seongnam (March 31–April) 2), Yeosu (April 7–9), Daejeon (April 14–16), and Incheon (April 21–23).

Filmography

Film

Television series

Web series

Stage

Musical Concert

Musical

Theater

Discography

Audiobook

Ensemble recording

Cast recording

Television soundtracks

Ambassadorship

Awards and nominations

Notes

References

External links 

 Crebig Entertainment | Artist | Bae Hae-seon (배해선) Official website
 
 

1974 births
Living people
People from Seoul
South Korean film actresses
South Korean musical theatre actresses
South Korean stage actresses
South Korean television actresses
South Korean web series actresses
20th-century South Korean actresses
21st-century South Korean actresses